Belmont Memorial Park is a cemetery located in Fresno, Fresno County, California.

Notable interments
Notable burials include:
 Henry Ellsworth Barbour (1877–1945), U.S. Representative
 Denver Church (1862–1952), U.S. Representative
 Walter Huston (1884–1950), actor
 Joe Jenkins (1890–1974), professional baseball player
 Richard Kiel (1939–2014), actor
 Bill Vukovich (1918–1955), Indianapolis 500 winner
 Billy Vukovich, III (1963–1990), race car driver
 Harold Zinkin (1922–2004), inventor of the Universal Gym Machine
 Bell T. Ritchie (1893–1970), president of the Fresno Musical Club which still today awards the Bell T. Ritchie Award to classically trained musicians

References

External links
 

Geography of Fresno, California
Protected areas of Fresno County, California
Cemeteries in Fresno County, California